The Transitional National Assembly of the Democratic Republic of the Congo was an appointed body consisting of representatives of the different parties to the peace agreement that ended the Second Congo War.

Composition

|-
! style="background-color:#E9E9E9;text-align:left;vertical-align:top;" |
! style="background-color:#E9E9E9;text-align:right;" |Seats
|-
| style="text-align:left;" |Congolese Rally for Democracy (Rassemblement Congolais pour la Democratie)

|94
|-
| style="text-align:left;" |Movement for the Liberation of Congo (Mouvement pour la Liberation du Congo)
|94
|-
| style="text-align:left;" |Government
|94
|-
| style="text-align:left;" |Political opposition
|94
|-
| style="text-align:left;" |Civil Society
|94
|-
| style="text-align:left;" |Congolese Rally for Democracy/Kisangani Liberation Movement (Rassemblement des Congolais pour la Démocratie/ Kisangani Mouvement de Libération)
|15
|-
| style="text-align:left;" |Rally of Congolese for Democracy-National (Rassemblement des Congolais pour la Démocratie – National)
|5
|-
| style="text-align:left;" |Maï-Maï
|10
|-
|style="background-color:#E9E9E9"|Total
|width="30" style="text-align:right;background-color:#E9E9E9"|500
|}

References
International Center for Transitional Justice, Democratic Republic of the Congo

2003 establishments in the Democratic Republic of the Congo
2006 disestablishments in the Democratic Republic of the Congo
Constituent assemblies
Defunct unicameral legislatures
Government of the Democratic Republic of the Congo